Revision – Apocalypse II is a 2009 drama/ horror film written and directed by Edwin Brienen. The film is an international co-production of Germany, Netherlands and the United States and celebrated its premiere at the Netherlands Film Festival in 2010.

Plot
A government-controlled society. Former nude model Traci (Eva Dorrepaal) has lost her grip on reality. She feels threatened by an invisible force, a ‘Big Brother’. Under influence of her photographer husband Charlie (Clayton Nemrow), she rejects God and surrenders herself to the ultimate act of evil: murder. Outside the streets are burning. The return of a false Messiah causes destruction and chaos. Haunted by her inner-demon (Jacob Dove Basker), Traci slowly sinks into madness.

Soundtrack
All music was written and performed by the House of Destructo, a project of Dutch producer Vincent Koreman. The Horrorist makes an appearance with the song ‘Sex Machine’.

Critical response
"Inappropriate? Monstrous? Or is it crossing borders? And simply brilliant? It actually all fits: 'Revision' is eccentric and over-the-top. Brienen belongs to a small group of directors: you can love him and hate him at the same time."
-Filmkrant, Netherlands

DVD
European Filmfreak Distribution released the film in 2010. A North-American DVD release is scheduled for 21 August 2012 through MVD Visual.

External links
 
  MVD Visual US Release
 Official website director
 
 Filmkrant review (Dutch only)

2009 films
American independent films
2000s English-language films
English-language Dutch films
English-language German films
2009 horror films
German independent films
Dutch independent films
American supernatural horror films
German horror films
Dutch horror films
2000s American films
2000s German films